Good Girl Jane is a 2022 American drama film directed by Sarah Elizabeth Mintz and starring Andie MacDowell.  It is Mintz's feature directorial debut.

Cast
Andie MacDowell
Patrick Gibson as Jamie
Rain Spencer as Jane
Odessa A'zion as Bailey
Jules Lorenzo as Kaya
Olan Prenatt as Abel
Diego Chiat as Benji
Eloisa Huggins as Izzie
Gale Harold

Production
Filming wrapped in Los Angeles in March 2021.

Release
The film premiered in June 2022 at the Tribeca Film Festival.

Reception
Good Girl Jane has a rating of 70% based on 10 critics' reviews on review aggregate website Rotten Tomatoes.

Kristen Lopez of IndieWire gave the film a negative review and wrote, "It’s hard to shake how hollow everything feels within “Good Girl Jane.” For all the individual performances, the feature never comes off as more than a supersized short film, with certain scenes playing like filler to get to a nearly two-hour running time."

Accolades
At the Tribeca Festival, the film won the Founders’ Award for Best U.S. Narrative Feature and Rain Spencer won the Best Performance award.

References

External links
 
 

2022 directorial debut films
2022 drama films
2022 films
2020s English-language films